Pour cent briques, t'as plus rien...  (English title: For 200 Grand, You Get Nothing Now) is a French comedy film directed by Édouard Molinaro. It was released in 1982.

Plot
Sam and Paul hold-up a bank.

Cast
 Daniel Auteuil : Sam
 Gérard Jugnot : Paul
 Jean-Pierre Castaldi : Henri
 Isabelle Mergault : Ginette
 Georges Géret : Bouvard Commissioner
 François Perrot : The director
 Darry Cowl : The policemen
 Patrice Laffont : Himself
 Guillaume Durand : Himself
 Édouard Molinaro : Newspaper seller
 Élisa Servier

References

External links

1980s French-language films
1981 films
1981 comedy films
French comedy films
1980s French films